The term San Diego fires or San Diego wildfires may refer to:

 Cedar Fire (2003)
 2005 Labor Day brush fire
 October 2007 California wildfires#San Diego County, which includes the Witch Creek Fire and the Harris Fire
 Witch Fire
 Harris Fire
 May 2014 San Diego County wildfires
 May 2016 4S Ranch brush fire
 San Diego Wildfire - American Basketball Association team